Port Blakely is a community of Bainbridge Island, Washington in the western United States. It is located on the east side of the island, slightly to the south. The center of Port Blakely is generally defined as the intersection of Blakely Hill Road and Blakely Avenue NE, although the wider area is generally also known as Port Blakely.

The community's name was at one time spelled as Port Blakeley.

Hall Brothers Shipyard and Port Blakely Mill
Port Blakely was named in 1841 by the Wilkes Expedition for the American naval officer Johnston Blakely.

In 1863, William Renton began operating a sawmill at Port Blakeley.  In 1880, brothers Isaac, Winslow and Henry Knox Hall moved their shipyard from Port Ludlow, Washington to a site near the Port Blakely Lumber Mill. At one point, this mill was "the world's largest sawmill under one roof." The lumber mills and shipyard of Port Blakely were adjoined by extensive living quarters and public amenities for mill workers and their families.

"The first true five-masted schooner built on the West Coast was the Inca, built at Port Blakely in 1896." H.K. Hall a 1,237-ton five-masted schooner, was launched here in 1902.

"Between 1881 and 1904, the Hall Brothers launched 77 vessels of every size and rig, including barks, barkentines, three-, four-, and five-masted schooners, steamers, a tug, a government revenue cutter and several yachts. Hall Brothers was largely responsible for building most of the schooners for the Pacific Coast lumber trade."

The shipyard was moved to Winslow in 1903.

Associated media 
Port Blakely was featured in the documentary Port Blakely: Memories of a Mill Town by film maker Lucy Ostrander and her husband Don Sellers.

See also
 Inca (schooner)
 List of Bainbridge Island communities
 Lyman D. Foster (schooner)

Notes

External links

 Hall Brothers Shipyards, the Port Blakely Years
 Port Blakely Mill, Islandwood School
 Port Blakely Mill, Port Blakely Companies
 Captain William Renton (1818-1891), founder of Port Blakely Mill
 Port Blakely Lumber Mill Interior, 2009
 Loss of the Four Masted Schooner Winslow, built Port Blakely

Communities of Bainbridge Island, Washington
Shipyards of the United States
Defunct shipbuilding companies of the United States
Industrial buildings and structures in Washington (state)
Shipbuilding in Washington (state)